Gastón Taborga (born 11 November 1960) is a Bolivian footballer. He played in 16 matches for the Bolivia national football team from 1980 to 1987. He was also part of Bolivia's squad for the 1987 Copa América tournament.

References

External links
 

1960 births
Living people
Bolivian footballers
Bolivia international footballers
Association football forwards
Sportspeople from Cochabamba

Club Aurora managers